Department of Prison is a department of the Ministry of Home Affairs responsible for the management and security of prisons in Bangladesh and is located in Dhaka, Bangladesh. Bangladesh Jail falls under its administration which is headed by Inspector General of Prison Brigadier General ASM Anisul Haque.

History
The headquarters of the department are located in Dhaka Central Jail compound. Since November 1977, the prison departments had been headed by Armed Forces officers with the exception President Abdus Sattar in 1980.

References

1973 establishments in Bangladesh
Organisations based in Dhaka
Government departments of Bangladesh
Prisons in Bangladesh